Live at the Village Vanguard Vol. 2 is a live album by the George Adams-Don Pullen Quartet recorded in 1983 and released on the Italian Soul Note label.

Reception
The Allmusic review by Stephen Cook awarded the album 4½ stars, stating: "Everyone contributes fine solo work, while also keeping everything nice and in the pocket. A highlight from the Pullen-Adams catalog and one of the most impressive of contemporary live jazz dates". The Penguin Guide to Jazz awarded the album 3 stars, stating: "The working band in exelsis, rounding off a half-decade of activity with a couple of heated – sometimes overheated – sets. Perhaps oddly, given the chemistry, this is a band that always sounded better in the studio".

Track listing
All compositions by Don Pullen except as indicated
 "Saturday Night in the Cosmos" – 11:25 
 "City Gates" (George Adams) – 17:40 
 "The Great Escape" – 11:15 
 "Big Alice" – 17:44 
Recorded at the Village Vanguard in New York City on August 19, 1983.

Personnel
Don Pullen – piano
George Adams – tenor saxophone, flute
Cameron Brown – bass
Dannie Richmond – drums

References

Black Saint/Soul Note live albums
Don Pullen live albums
George Adams (musician) live albums
1983 live albums
Albums recorded at the Village Vanguard